Chordeleg Canton is a canton of Ecuador, located in the Azuay Province.  Its capital is the town of Chordeleg.  Its population at the 2001 census was 10,859.

Demographics
Ethnic groups as of the Ecuadorian census of 2010:
Mestizo  93.8%
White  4.4%
Afro-Ecuadorian  1.5%
Montubio  0.2%
Indigenous  0.2%
Other  0.1%

References

Cantons of Azuay Province